Copston Magna is a very small village and civil parish in the Rugby borough of Warwickshire, England. It is also located close to the ancient site of High Cross, on the border between Warwickshire and Leicestershire, where the Roman roads of Watling Street and Fosse Way cross each other. In the 2001 Census, the parish had a population of 38. At the 2011 census population details were included with Wolvey

The most notable building in Copston Magna is St John's Church, which was built in 1849 by the sisters of Rudolph Feilding, 8th Earl of Denbigh, who opposed his conversion to Catholicism. It is a grade II* listed building.

References

Warwickshire Towns & Villages, by Geoff Allen (2000)

External links

Villages in Warwickshire